K. Balachander is an Indian film director, screenwriter and producer who works mainly in the Tamil film industry. He is well known for his distinct film-making style often dealing with interpersonal relationships and themes of social relevance.

Starting his career as a playwright, he made his cinematic debut as a dialog writer for Dheiva Thaai in 1964. The following year he made his directional debut through Neer Kumizhi a film based on his own play. He secured his first National Film Award for Iru Kodugal, a family drama film released in 1969. His 1975 film Apoorva Raagangal won the award for the Best Feature Film in Tamil. The 1981 Tamil film Thanneer Thanneer that dealt with social issues such as water scarcity and political corruption fetched him the National Film Award for Best Screenplay and the Best Regional Film award. He started his own production house in 1981 and named it Kavithalayaa Productions which produced several of his award-winning films like Achamillai Achamillai and Sindhu Bhairavi. He also made forays into Telugu cinema, Hindi cinema and Kannada cinema. His Maro Charitra and its Hindi remake Ek Duuje Ke Liye were huge box-office success and received critical acclaim. For Ek Duuje Ke Liye he received three Filmfare nominations—Best Story, Best Screenplay and Best Director—eventually winning the award for the Best Screenplay. The film was highly responsible in catapulting Balachander to national acclaim. Rudraveena fetched him the Nargis Dutt Award for Best Feature Film on National Integration in 1988. Four years later Roja, a Kavithaalaya production won the same award.

As of 2013, Balachander has directed over 80 films and has worked in more than 100 films either as director or a screenwriter. In 1987 he was honoured with the Padma Shri, India's fourth highest civilian honour. He has won nine National Film Awards and multiple Filmfare Awards. Balachander is also a recipient of various state awards like the Tamil Nadu State Film Awards and the Nandi Awards, instituted by the Government of Andhra Pradesh. In 2010 the Dadasaheb Phalke Award was bestowed upon him for his contributions to Indian cinema; he was the second personality and the first director from Tamil cinema to receive the award. The following year he was awarded with the ANR National Award by the Government of Andhra Pradesh.

Civilian honors

National Film Awards

Filmfare Awards

Filmfare Awards South

Balachander holds the record for being nominated for the Filmfare Best Tamil Director Award most number of times, being eighteen. He has won the award 7 times.

Government of Tamil Nadu

Honorary doctorate

Tamil Nadu State Film Awards

Nandi Awards

Santhome Awards

ANR National Award

Cine Technicians Association Awards

Other awards
 The TV series Kai Alavu Manasu written and directed by him won the Onida Pinnacle Award in 1995.
 "Lifetime Achievement award" at the 39th International Film Festival of India in 2008.
 Chevalier Sivaji Ganesan Award for Excellence in Indian Cinema, Vijay Awards awarded in 2011

Notes

References
 
 
 
 

Balachander